Timothy A. McKernan II (born July 29, 1989) is an American ice dancer who skates in partnership with Kimberley Hew-Low for Australia. They competed at the 2017 Four Continents Championships. Representing the United States with Piper Gilles, McKernan won one medal on the ISU Junior Grand Prix series and became the 2008 U.S. national junior silver medalist.

Personal life
McKernan was born in York, Pennsylvania. He is an army brat and has lived all over the country. His mother, Vicky, is a lieutenant colonel in the US Army Reserve. His father, Timothy A. McKernan Sr., is a Colonel in the U.S. Army and was deployed to Afghanistan at the time of the 2007 U.S. Championships and to Iraq at the time of the 2008 U.S. Figure Skating Championships.

After graduating from Cheyenne Mountain High School, McKernan attended the University of Colorado at Colorado Springs and then Eastern Michigan University. He graduated in December 2013 with a bachelor's degree in Earth Sciences.

From 2013-2019, McKernan was an assistant coach at the International Skating Academy at the Arctic Edge of Canton in Canton, MI USA. He taught alongside Marina Zoueva, Oleg Epstein, Johnny Johns, and Massimo Scali. He continued to teach in Canton after the departure of Marina Zoueva(Feb 2019) until October 2021. He now is a coach at the Dubai Mall Ice Rink in Dubai, United Arab Emirates.

Career
McKernan competed with Alicia Wallace in the 2002–03 season on the juvenile level. They competed at the 2003 U.S. Junior Championships and placed 9th in their qualifying group.

In January 2003, he teamed up with Piper Gilles. They began competing on the Intermediate level in 2004. During their career, they were the 2007 U.S. Junior Pewter Medalists and the 2008 U.S. Junior silver medalists. They announced the end of their partnership on May 22, 2008. Gilles / McKernan were coached by Patti Gottwein, Christopher Dean, and Rich Griffin.

McKernan teamed up with Shannon Wingle in the summer of 2008. They are coached by Igor Shpilband and Marina Zueva. They made their international debut at the 2008–09 ISU Junior Grand Prix event in Ostrava, Czech Republic, where they placed 7th.

In the 2016–17 season, McKernan began competing with Kimberley Hew-Low for Australia. They debuted their partnership at the NRW Trophy in early November 2016.

Programs  
(with Gilles)

Competitive highlights
CS: Challenger Series; JGP: Junior Grand Prix

With Hew-Low for Australia

With Wingle for the United States

With Gilles for the United States

References

External links
 
 

American male ice dancers
1989 births
Living people
Figure skaters from Colorado Springs, Colorado
Sportspeople from York, Pennsylvania